Gammon is a pejorative popularised in British political culture since around 2012. The term refers in particular to the colour of a person's flushed face when expressing their strong opinions, as compared to the type of pork of the same name. It is characterised in this context by the Oxford English Dictionary as occurring "in various parasynthetic adjectives referring to particularly reddish or florid complexions".

In 2018, it became particularly known as a term to describe either those on the political right or those who supported Brexit.  Due to its  referencing of skin colour, there is controversy as to whether the term is racist.

Recent history
In 2004, in a section termed "The Ten: Lamest Sporting Excuses" in The Observer, the following appeared:

In 2010, Caitlin Moran wrote that British Prime Minister David Cameron resembled "a slightly camp gammon robot" and "a C3PO made of ham" in her 13 March column in The Times, later collected in her 2012 anthology Moranthology.
 
In 2015, Ruby Tandoh called Great British Bake Off judge Paul Hollywood a "walking gammon joint".

In 2017, children's author Ben Davis tweeted a picture of nine members of a BBC Question Time audience and referred to them as "the Great Wall of Gammon", leading to the term becoming popularised, particularly on social media.

Earlier historical uses 
In 1604, John Marston wrote "Your devilship’s ring has no virtue, the buff-captain, the sallow-westphalian gammon-faced zaza cries" in The Malcontent.

In 1622, John Taylor wrote "Where many a warlike Horse & many a Nagge mires:Thou kildst the gammon visag'd poore Westphalians" in his verse poem The Great O Toole.

By the beginning of the 19th century, the word (sometimes extended to the phrase "gammon and spinach") had come to mean "humbug, a ridiculous story, deceitful talk". Writers of the era who used the word or phrase include Charlotte Brontë, Charles Dickens (in a number of works, including Nicholas Nickleby, Bleak House, The Pickwick Papers, and Oliver Twist), and Anthony Trollope. It has been suggested there is an association between Dickens' usage of the word in Nicholas Nickleby and the modern British usage. The word in its 19th Century usage remains current in Australian Aboriginal English (without reference to race or skin colour, meaning 'lying' or 'inauthentic').

The archetype of a red-faced, angry, pompous, jingoistic, and stereotypically British right-wing male has been in popular culture since the mid-20th century, with the character Colonel Blimp first appearing in 1934, in newspaper cartoons and in the film The Life and Death of Colonel Blimp in 1948.

See also
Disgusted of Tunbridge Wells
Fenqing
Little Englander
OK boomer
Redneck

References

Notes

Age-related stereotypes
Stereotypes of white people
Political terms in the United Kingdom
2010s slang
Class discrimination
Pejorative terms for white people